The 2017 ICC World Cricket League Americas Region Qualifiers is an international cricket tournament that is scheduled to take place in Belgrano, Argentina. The winner of the qualifiers will progress to ICC WCL Division 5 which will be staged in September 2017.

Teams 
Two teams invited by ICC for the tournament:

Fixtures

Round robin

Result 

Source: ICC

References 

2017–19 ICC World Cricket League
2017 in cricket